Vientiane (Viangchan) is the capital and largest city of Laos. Vientiane is divided  administratively into 9 cities with a total area of only approx. 3,920 square kilometres and is located on the banks of the Mekong, close to the Thai border. Vientiane was the administrative capital during French rule and, due to economic growth in recent times, is now the economic center of Laos. The city had a population of 1,001,477 as of the 2023 Census.

Vientiane is noted as the home of the most significant national monuments in Laos – Pha That Luang – which is a known symbol of Laos and an icon of Buddhism in Laos. Other significant Buddhist temples in Laos can be found there as well, such as Haw Phra Kaew, which formerly housed the Emerald Buddha.

The city hosted the 25th Southeast Asian Games in December 2009, celebrating 50 years of the games.

Etymology
'Vientiane' is the French name derived from the Lao Viangchan . The name was previously written '' (in Thai, เวียงจันทน์) but now usually written ''.  In Lao, viang refers to a 'walled city' whereas chan (previously ) derives from Sanskrit candana, 'sandalwood' and can be translated as the 'walled city of sandalwood'.  Some Laotians mistakenly believe it refers to the 'walled city of the moon' as chan can also represent 'moon', although this was previously distinguished in writing as ''.  Other romanisations include 'Viangchan' and 'Wiangchan'.

History

Dvaravati city state kingdoms
By the 6th century in the Chao Phraya River Valley, Mon peoples had coalesced to create the Dvaravati kingdoms.  In the north, Haripunjaya (Lamphun) emerged as a rival power to the Dvaravati.  By the 8th century the Mon had pushed north to create city states, in Fa Daet (modern Kalasin, northeastern Thailand), Sri Gotapura (Sikhottabong) near modern Tha Khek, Laos, Muang Sua (Luang Prabang), and Chantaburi (Vientiane).  In the 8th century CE, Sri Gotapura (Sikhottabong) was the strongest of these early city states, and controlled trade throughout the middle Mekong region. The city states were loosely bound politically, but were culturally similar and introduced Therevada Buddhism from Sri Lankan missionaries throughout the region.

Myth
The great Laotian epic, the Phra Lak Phra Lam, claims that Prince Thattaradtha founded the city when he left the legendary Lao kingdom of Muong Inthapatha Maha Nakhone because he was denied the throne in favor of his younger brother. Thattaradtha founded a city called Maha Thani Si Phan Phao on the western banks of the Mekong River; this city was said to have later become today's Udon Thani, Thailand. One day, a seven-headed Naga told Thattaradtha to start a new city on the east bank of the river opposite Maha Thani Si Phan Phao. The prince called this city Chanthabuly Si Sattanakhanahud; which was said to be the predecessor of modern Vientiane.

Contrary to the Phra Lak Phra Lam, most historians believe Vientiane was an early Khmer settlement centered around a Hindu temple, which the Pha That Luang would later replace. In the 11th and 12th centuries, the time when the Lao and Thai people are believed to have entered Southeast Asia from Southern China, the few remaining Khmers in the area were either killed, removed, or assimilated into the Lao civilization, which would soon overtake the area.

Khmer domination

The earliest reference of the name Vientiane can be seen on a Vietnamese inscription of Duke Đỗ Anh Vũ, dated 1159 during the Khmer-Viet conflict. The inscription says that in 1135, Văn Đan (Vientiane), a vassal of Zhenla (Khmer Empire), invaded Nghe An, but was repelled by the Duke; the Duke led an army chased the invaders as far as Vũ Ôn? (unattested), and then returned with captives. This name may have traced it origin to Wèndān, a supposedly kingdom located in the Khorat Plateau, mentioned by a ninth-century Chinese writer described a trade route which started at Hanoi and crossed the western mountains to Wèndān.

Lan Xang and French colonial rule
In 1354, when Fa Ngum founded the kingdom of Lan Xang. Vientiane became an important administrative city, even though it was not made the capital. King Setthathirath officially established it as the capital of Lan Xang in 1563, to avoid Burmese invasion. When Lan Xang fell apart in 1707, it became an independent Kingdom of Vientiane. In 1779, it was conquered by the Siamese general Phraya Chakri and made a vassal of Siam.

When King Anouvong raised an unsuccessful rebellion, it was obliterated by Siamese armies in 1827. The city was burned to the ground and was looted of nearly all Laotian artifacts, including Buddha statues and people. Vientiane was in great disrepair, depopulated and disappearing into the forest when the French arrived. It eventually passed to French rule in 1893. It became the capital of the French protectorate of Laos in 1899. The French rebuilt the city and rebuilt or repaired Buddhist temples such as Pha That Luang, Haw Phra Kaew, and left many colonial buildings behind. 

During French rule, the Vietnamese were encouraged to migrate to Laos, which resulted in 53% of the population of Vientiane being Vietnamese in the year 1943. As late as 1945, the French drew up an ambitious plan to move massive Vietnamese population to three key areas (i.e. the Vientiane Plain, the Savannakhet region, and the Bolaven Plateau), which was only interrupted by the Japanese invasion of Indochina. If this plan had been implemented, according to Martin Stuart-Fox, the Lao might well have lost control over their own country.

During World War II, Vientiane fell with little resistance and was occupied by Japanese forces, under the command of Sako Masanori. On 9 March 1945, French paratroopers arrived and reoccupied the city on 24 April 1945.

Independence
The city became the national capital of the newly independent Lao state in 1953.

As the Laotian Civil War broke out between the Royal Lao Government and the Pathet Lao, Vientiane became unstable. In August 1960, Kong Le seized the capital and insisted that Souvanna Phouma become prime minister. In mid-December, Phoumi Nosavan then seized the capital, overthrew the Phouma Government, and installed Boun Oum as prime minister. In mid-1975, Pathet Lao troops moved towards the city and Americans began evacuating the capital. On 23 August 1975, a contingent of 50 Pathet Lao women symbolically liberated the city. On 2 December 1975, the communist party of the Pathet Lao took over Vientiane, defeated the Kingdom of Laos, and renamed the country the Lao People's Democratic Republic, which ended the Laotian Civil War. The next day, an Insurgency in Laos began in the jungle, with the Pathet Lao fighting factions of Hmong and royalists.

Vientiane was the host of the incident-free 2009 Southeast Asian Games. Eighteen competitions were dropped from the previous games held in Thailand, due to Laos' landlocked borders and the lack of adequate facilities in Vientiane.

Geography
Vientiane is on a bend of the Mekong River, at which point it forms the border with Thailand.

Climate
Vientiane features a tropical savanna climate (Köppen Aw) with a distinct wet season and a dry season. Vientiane's dry season spans from November through March. April marks the onset of the wet season which in Vientiane lasts about seven months. Vientiane tends to be very hot and humid throughout the course of the year, though temperatures in the city tend to be somewhat cooler during the dry season than the wet season.
Highest recorded temperature is 41.1C in April 1983 and the lowest is 2.4C in January 1924.

Tourism

Although still a small city, the capital attracts many tourists. The city contains many temples and Buddhist monuments. A popular attraction for foreign visitors is Pha That Luang, an important national cultural monument of Laos and one of its best known stupas. It was originally built in 1566 by King Setthathirath and was restored in 1953.

Another site that is also popular amongst tourists is Wat Si Muang. The temple was built on the ruins of a Khmer Hindu shrine, the remains of which can be seen behind the ordination hall. It was built in 1563 and is believed to be guarded by the spirit of a local girl, Nang Si. Legend tells that Nang Si, who was pregnant at the time, leapt to her death as a sacrifice, just as the pillar was being lowered into the hole. In front of the temple stands a statue of King Sisavang Vong.

The memorial monument, Patuxai, built between 1957 and 1968, is perhaps the most prominent landmark in the city. While the Arc de Triomphe in Paris inspired the architecture, the design incorporates typical Lao motifs including Kinnari, a mythical bird woman. Energetic visitors can climb to the top of the monument for a panoramic view of the city.

Buddha Park was built in 1958 by Luang Pu Bunleua Sulilat and contains a collection of Buddhist and Hindu sculptures, scattered amongst gardens and trees.

Vientiane is home to one of the three bowling alleys in Laos (the other two are in Luang Prabang and Pakse).

Other sites include:
 Haw Phra Kaew, former temple, now a museum and small shops
 Lao National Museum
 Kaysone Phomvihane Museum
 Talat Sao Morning market
 That Dam, large stupa
 Wat Ong Teu Mahawihan, a Buddhist monastery
 Wat Sri Chomphu Ong Tue, a Buddhist temple 
 Wat Si Saket, Buddhist wat
 Wat Sok Pa Luang, a Buddhist temple
 Settha Palace Hotel, established 1932
 The Sanjiang Market

Colleges and universities
The National University of Laos, one of three universities in the country, is in Vientiane.

Broadcasting
 Lao National Radio has a large mediumwave transmitter with a 277-metre guyed mast at 18° 20' 33"N, 102° 27' 01"E.
 China Radio International (CRI) FM 93.0.

Economy
Vientiane is the driving force behind economic change in Laos. In recent years, the city has experienced rapid economic growth from foreign investment. In 2011, the stock exchange opened with two listed company stocks, with the cooperation of South Korea.

Transportation

Within Laos
There are regular bus services connecting Vientiane Bus Station with the rest of the country. In Vientiane, regular bus services around the city are provided by Vientiane Capital State Bus Enterprise.

From Thailand

The First Thai-Lao Friendship Bridge, built in the 1990s, crosses the river 18 kilometres downstream of the city of Nong Khai in Thailand, and is the major crossing between the two countries. The official name of the bridge was changed in 2007 by the addition of "First", after the Second Friendship Bridge linking Mukdahan in Thailand with Savannakhet in Laos was opened early in 2007.

A metre gauge railway link over the first bridge was formally inaugurated on 5 March 2009, ending at Thanaleng Railway Station, in Dongphosy village (Vientiane Prefecture), 20 km east of Vientiane. As of November 2010, Lao officials plan to convert the station into a rail cargo terminal for freight trains, allowing cargo to be transported from Bangkok into Laos more cheaply than via road. This rail link is being extended into Vientiane city, with the new Khamsavath Train Station scheduled to open in mid-2023.

Daily non-stop bus services run between Vientiane and Nong Khai, Udon Thani, and Khon Kaen.

From China
The Boten–Vientiane railway (sometimes referred to as the China–Laos railway or Laos–China railway) is an   electrified railway in Laos, running between the capital Vientiane and the town of Boten on the border with China. The line was officially opened on 3 December 2021.

By air
Vientiane is served by Wattay International Airport with international connections to other Asian countries. Lao Airlines has regular flights to several domestic destinations in the country (including several flights daily to Luang Prabang, plus a few flights weekly to other local destinations). In Thailand, Udon Thani International Airport, one of Wattay's main connections, is less than 90 km distant.

Healthcare
The "Centre Medical de l'Ambassade de France" is available to the foreign community in Laos. The Mahosot Hospital is an important local hospital in treating and researching diseases and is connected with the University of Oxford. In 2011 the Alliance Clinic opened near the airport, with a connection to Thai hospitals. The Setthathirat International Clinic has foreign doctors. A free, 24/7 ambulance service is provided by Vientiane Rescue, a volunteer-run rescue service established in 2010.

Notable people
 

Kanya Kounvongsa (born 1990), Laotian football player

See also

 Kingdom of Vientiane
 National Library of Laos
 Auguste Pavie
 Vat Yotkeo
 1987 Vientiane bombing

References

Further reading
 Askew, Marc, William Stewart Logan, and Colin Long. Vientiane: Transformations of a Lao Landscape. London: Routledge, 2007. 
 Sharifi et al., Can master planning control and regulate urban growth in Vientiane, Laos?. Landscape and Urban Planning, 2014. DOI: 10.1016/j.landurbplan.2014.07.014
 Flores, Penelope V. Good-Bye, Vientiane: Untold Stories of Filipinos in Laos. San Francisco, CA: Philippine American Writers and Artists, Inc, 2005. 
 Renaut, Thomas, and Arnaud Dubus. Eternal Vientiane. City heritage. Hong Kong: Published by Fortune Image Ltd. for Les Editions d'Indochine, 1995.
 Schrama, Ilse, and Birgit Schrama. Buddhist Temple Life in Laos: Wat Sok Pa Luang. Bangkok: Orchid Press, 2006. 
 Women's International Group Laos. Vientiane Guide. Vientiane: Women's International Group, 1993.

External links

 
Capitals in Asia
Districts of Laos
Populated places in Vientiane Province
Laos–Thailand border crossings
16th century in Lan Xang
17th century in Lan Xang
18th century in Vientiane
19th century in Vientiane
Populated places in Laos
9th-century establishments in Asia
Populated places established in 1560